Babylon was the capital city of the ancient Babylonian Empire, which itself is a term referring to either of two separate empires in the Mesopotamian area in antiquity. These two empires achieved regional dominance between the 19th and 15th centuries BC, and again between the 7th and 6th centuries BC. The city, built along both banks of the Euphrates river, had steep embankments to contain the river's seasonal floods. The site of the ancient city lies just south of present-day Baghdad.

The earliest known mention of Babylon as a small town appears on a clay tablet from the reign of Shar-Kali-Sharri (2217–2193 BC) of the Akkadian Empire. Babylon was merely a religious and cultural centre at this point and neither an independent state nor a large city; like the rest of Mesopotamia, it was subject to the Akkadian Empire which united all the Akkadian and Sumerian speakers under one rule. After the collapse of the Akkadian Empire, the south Mesopotamian region was dominated by the Gutian people for a few decades before the rise of the Third Dynasty of Ur, which encompassed the whole of Mesopotamia, including the town of Babylon.

The town became part of a small independent city-state with the rise of the first Babylonian Empire, now known as the Old Babylonian Empire, in the 19th century BC. The Amorite king Hammurabi founded the short-lived Old Babylonian Empire in the 18th century BC. He built Babylon into a major city and declared himself its king. Southern Mesopotamia became known as Babylonia, and Babylon eclipsed Nippur as the region's holy city. The empire waned under Hammurabi's son Samsu-iluna, and Babylon spent long periods under Assyrian, Kassite and Elamite domination. After the Assyrians had destroyed and then rebuilt it, Babylon became the capital of the short-lived Neo-Babylonian Empire from 609 to 539 BC. The Hanging Gardens of Babylon ranked as one of the Seven Wonders of the Ancient World. After the fall of the Neo-Babylonian Empire, the city came under the rule of the Achaemenid, Seleucid, Parthian, Roman, Sassanid, and Muslim empires. The last known habitation of the town dates from the 10th century AD, when it was referred to as the "small village of Babel".

It has been estimated that Babylon was the largest city in the world , and again . It was perhaps the first city to reach a population above 200,000.

They comprise a large tell of broken mud-brick buildings and debris. The main sources of information about Babylon—excavation of the site itself, references in cuneiform texts found elsewhere in Mesopotamia, references in the Bible, descriptions in other classical writing (especially by Herodotus), and second-hand descriptions (citing the work of Ctesias and Berossus)—present an incomplete and sometimes contradictory picture of the ancient city, even at its peak in the sixth century BC. UNESCO inscribed Babylon as a World Heritage Site in 2019. The site receives thousands of visitors each year, almost all of whom are Iraqis. Construction is rapidly increasing, which has caused encroachments on the ruins.

Name
The spelling Babylon is the Latin representation of Greek Babylṓn, derived from the native (Babylonian) , meaning "gate of the god(s)".
This would correspond to the Sumerian phrase kan dig̃irak.
The sign 𒆍 (KA₂) is the logogram for "gate", 𒀭 (DIG̃IR) means "god", and 𒊏 (RA) represents the coda of the word dig̃ir (-r) followed by the genitive suffix -ak. The final 𒆠 is a determinative indicating that the previous signs are to be understood as a place name.

Archibald Sayce, writing in the 1870s, postulated that the Semitic name was a loan-translation of the original Sumerian name. 
However, the "gate of god" interpretation is increasingly viewed as a Semitic folk etymology to explain an unknown original non-Semitic placename. I. J. Gelb in 1955 argued that the original name was Babilla, of unknown meaning and origin, as there were other similarly named places in Sumer, and there are no other examples of Sumerian place-names being replaced with Akkadian translations. He deduced that it later transformed into Akkadian , and that the Sumerian name Kan-dig̃irak was a loan translation of the Semitic folk etymology, and not the original name. The re-translation of the Semitic name into Sumerian would have taken place at the time of the "Neo-Sumerian" Third Dynasty of Ur. (Bab-Il).

In the Hebrew Bible, the name appears as Babel ( Bavel, Tib.  Bāḇel;  Bāwēl,  Bāḇel; in  Bābil), interpreted in the Book of Genesis to mean "confusion", from the verb bilbél ("to confuse"). The modern English verb,  ("to speak foolish, excited, or confusing talk"), is popularly thought to derive from this name but there is no direct connection.

In Pali and Sanskrit literature, the name appears as Bāveru.

Ancient records in some situations use "Babylon" as a name for other cities, including cities like Borsippa within Babylon's sphere of influence, and Nineveh for a short period after the Assyrian sack of Babylon.

Geography

The ancient city, built along both banks of the Euphrates river, had steep embankments to contain the river's seasonal floods. Originally, the river roughly bisected the city, but the course of the river has since shifted so that most of the remains of the former western part of the city are now inundated. Some portions of the city wall to the west of the river also remain.

Only a small portion of the ancient city (3% of the area within the inner walls; 1.5% of the area within the outer walls; 0.1% at the depth of Middle and Old Babylon) has been excavated. Known remains include:
Kasr – also called Palace or Castle, it is the location of the Neo-Babylonian ziggurat Etemenanki and lies in the center of the site.
It is the site of Esagila, a temple of Marduk that also contained shrines to Ea and Nabu.
Homera – a reddish-colored mound on the west side. Most of the Hellenistic remains are here.
Its bricks have been subject to looting since ancient times. It held a palace built by Nebuchadnezzar.

Archaeologists have recovered few artifacts predating the Neo-Babylonian period. The water table in the region has risen greatly over the centuries, and artifacts from the time before the Neo-Babylonian Empire are unavailable to current standard archaeological methods. Additionally, the Neo-Babylonians conducted significant rebuilding projects in the city, which destroyed or obscured much of the earlier record. Babylon was pillaged numerous times after revolting against foreign rule, most notably by the Hittites and Elamites in the 2nd millennium, then by the Neo-Assyrian Empire and the Achaemenid Empire in the 1st millennium BC. Much of the western half of the city is now beneath the river, and other parts of the site have been mined for commercial building materials.

Only the Koldewey expedition recovered artifacts from the Old Babylonian period. These included 967 clay tablets (along with 564 tablets from the Middle Babylonian period), stored in private houses, with Sumerian literature and lexical documents.

Nearby ancient settlements are Kish, Borsippa, Dilbat, and Kutha.

Sources 

The main sources of information about Babylon—excavation of the site itself, references in cuneiform texts found elsewhere in Mesopotamia, references in the Bible, descriptions in other classical writing (especially by Herodotus), and second-hand descriptions (citing the work of Ctesias and Berossus)—present an incomplete and sometimes contradictory picture of the ancient city, even at its peak in the sixth century BC. Babylon was described, perhaps even visited, by a number of classical historians including Ctesias, Herodotus, Quintus Curtius Rufus, Strabo, and Cleitarchus. These reports are of variable accuracy and some of the content was politically motivated, but these still provide useful information.

Historical knowledge of early Babylon must be pieced together from epigraphic remains found elsewhere, such as at Uruk, Nippur, Sippar, Mari, and Haradum.

Early references 

The earliest known mention of Babylon as a small town appears on a clay tablet from the reign of Shar-Kali-Sharri (2217–2193 BC) of the Akkadian Empire. References to the city of Babylon can be found in Akkadian and Sumerian literature from the late third millennium BC. One of the earliest is a tablet describing the Akkadian king Šar-kali-šarri laying the foundations in Babylon of new temples for Annūnı̄tum and Ilaba. Babylon also appears in the administrative records of the Third Dynasty of Ur, which collected in-kind tax payments and appointed an ensi as local governor.

The so-called Weidner Chronicle (also known as ABC 19) states that Sargon of Akkad ( in the short chronology) had built Babylon "in front of Akkad" (ABC 19:51). A later chronicle states that Sargon "dug up the dirt of the pit of Babylon, and made a counterpart of Babylon next to Akkad". (ABC 20:18–19). Van de Mieroop has suggested that those sources may refer to the much later Assyrian king Sargon II of the Neo-Assyrian Empire rather than Sargon of Akkad.

Classical dating

Ctesias, quoted by Diodorus Siculus and in George Syncellus's Chronographia, claimed to have access to manuscripts from Babylonian archives, which date the founding of Babylon to 2286 BC, under the reign of its first king, Belus. A similar figure is found in the writings of Berossus, who, according to Pliny, stated that astronomical observations commenced at Babylon 490 years before the Greek era of Phoroneus, indicating 2243 BC. Stephanus of Byzantium wrote that Babylon was built 1002 years before the date given by Hellanicus of Lesbos for the siege of Troy (1229 BC), which would date Babylon's foundation to 2231 BC. All of these dates place Babylon's foundation in the 23rd century BC; however, cuneiform records have not been found to correspond with these classical (post-cuneiform) accounts.

History

The first attested mention of Babylon was in the late 3rd millennium BC during the Akkadian Empire reign of ruler Shar-Kali-Sharri one of whose year names mentions building two temples there. Babylon was ruled by ensi (governors) for the empire. Some of the known governors were Abba, Arši-aḫ, Itūr-ilum, Murteli, Unabatal, and Puzur-Tutu. After that nothing is heard of the city until the time of Sumu-la-El. After around 1950 BC Amorite kingdoms will appear in Uruk and Larsa in the south.

Old Babylonian period

According to a Babylonian king list, Amorite rule in Babylon began with a chieftain named Sumu-abum, who declared independence from the neighboring city-state of Kazallu. Sumu-la-El, whose dates may be concurrent with those of Sumu-abum, is usually given as the progenitor of the First Babylonian dynasty. Both are credited with building the walls of Babylon. In any case, the records describe Sumu-la-El's military successes establishing a regional sphere of influence for Babylon.

Babylon was initially a minor city-state, and controlled little surrounding territory; its first four Amorite rulers did not assume the title of king. The older and more powerful states of, Elam, Isin, and Larsa overshadowed Babylon until it became the capital of Hammurabi's short-lived empire about a century later. Hammurabi (r. 1792–1750 BC) is famous for codifying the laws of Babylonia into the Code of Hammurabi. He conquered all of the cities and city states of southern Mesopotamia, including Isin, Larsa, Ur, Uruk, Nippur, Lagash, Eridu, Kish, Adab, Eshnunna, Akshak, Shuruppak, Bad-tibira, Sippar, and Girsu, coalescing them into one kingdom, ruled from Babylon. Hammurabi also invaded and conquered Elam to the east, and the kingdoms of Mari and Ebla to the northwest. After a conflict with the Old Assyrian period king Ishme-Dagan, he forced his successor to pay tribute late in his reign.

After the reign of Hammurabi, the whole of southern Mesopotamia came to be known as Babylonia. From this time, Babylon supplanted Nippur and Eridu as the major religious centers of southern Mesopotamia. Hammurabi's empire destabilized after his death. The far south of Mesopotamia broke away, forming the native Sealand Dynasty, and the Elamites appropriated territory in eastern Mesopotamia. The Amorite dynasty remained in power in Babylon, which again became a small city state. After the destruction of the city the Kassites rose to control the region.

Texts from Old Babylon often include references to Shamash, the sun-god of Sippar, treated as a supreme deity, and Marduk, considered as his son. Marduk was later elevated to a higher status and Shamash lowered, perhaps reflecting Babylon's rising political power.

Middle Babylon 

In 1595 BC the city was overthrown by the Hittite Empire from Asia Minor. Thereafter, Kassites from the Zagros Mountains captured the city of Babylon, renaming it Karduniash, ushering in a dynasty that lasted for 435 years, until 1160 BC.

Babylon weakened during the Kassite era, and as a result, Kassite Babylon began paying tribute to the Pharaoh of Egypt, Thutmose III, following his eighth campaign against Mitanni. Kassite Babylon eventually became subject to the Middle Assyrian Empire (1365–1053 BC) to the north, and Elam to the east, with both powers vying for control of the city.

By 1155 BC, after continued attacks and annexing of territory by the Assyrians and Elamites, the Kassites were deposed in Babylon. An Akkadian south Mesopotamian dynasty then ruled for the first time. However, Babylon remained weak and subject to domination by Assyria. Its ineffectual native kings were unable to prevent new waves of foreign West Semitic settlers from the deserts of the Levant, including the Arameans and Suteans in the 11th century BC, and finally the Chaldeans in the 9th century BC, entering and appropriating areas of Babylonia for themselves. The Arameans briefly ruled in Babylon during the late 11th century BC.

Assyrian period

During the rule of the Neo-Assyrian Empire (911–609 BC), Babylonia was under constant Assyrian domination or direct control. During the reign of Sennacherib of Assyria, Babylonia was in a constant state of revolt, led by a chieftain named Merodach-Baladan, in alliance with the Elamites, and suppressed only by the complete destruction of the city of Babylon. In 689 BC, its walls, temples and palaces were razed, and the rubble was thrown into the Arakhtu, the sea bordering the earlier Babylon on the south. The destruction of the religious center shocked many, and the subsequent murder of Sennacherib by two of his own sons while praying to the god Nisroch was considered an act of atonement. Consequently, his successor, Esarhaddon hastened to rebuild the old city and make it his residence for part of the year. After his death, Babylonia was governed by his elder son, the Assyrian prince Shamash-shum-ukin, who eventually started a civil war in 652 BC against his own brother, Ashurbanipal, who ruled in Nineveh. Shamash-shum-ukin enlisted the help of other peoples against Assyria, including Elam, Persia, the Chaldeans, and Suteans of southern Mesopotamia, and the Canaanites and Arabs dwelling in the deserts south of Mesopotamia.

Once again, Babylon was besieged by the Assyrians, starved into surrender and its allies were defeated. Ashurbanipal celebrated a "service of reconciliation", but did not venture to "take the hands" of Bel. An Assyrian governor named Kandalanu was appointed as ruler of the city. Ashurbanipal did collect texts from Babylon for inclusion in his extensive library at Ninevah.

After the death of Ashurbanipal, the Assyrian empire was destabilized due to a series of internal civil wars throughout the reigns of the Assyrian kings Ashur-etil-ilani, Sin-shumu-lishir, and Sinsharishkun. Eventually, Babylon, like many other parts of the Near East, took advantage of the chaos within Assyria to free itself from Assyrian rule. In the subsequent overthrow of the Assyrian Empire by an alliance of peoples, the Babylonians saw another example of divine vengeance.

Neo-Babylonian Empire

Under Nabopolassar, Babylon escaped Assyrian rule, and the allied Medo-Babylonian armies finally destroyed the Assyrian Empire between 626 BC and 609 BC. Babylon thus became the capital of the Neo-Babylonian (sometimes called the Chaldean) Empire.

With the recovery of Babylonian independence, a new era of architectural activity ensued, particularly during the reign of his son Nebuchadnezzar II (604–561 BC). Nebuchadnezzar ordered the complete reconstruction of the imperial grounds, including the Etemenanki ziggurat, and the construction of the Ishtar Gate—the most prominent of eight gates around Babylon. A reconstruction of the Ishtar Gate is located in the Pergamon Museum in Berlin.

Nebuchadnezzar is also credited with the construction of the Hanging Gardens of Babylon, one of the Seven Wonders of the Ancient World, said to have been built for his homesick wife, Amytis. Whether the gardens actually existed is a matter of dispute. German archaeologist Robert Koldewey speculated that he had discovered its foundations, but many historians disagree about the location. Stephanie Dalley has argued that the hanging gardens were actually located in the Assyrian capital, Nineveh.

Nebuchadnezzar is also notoriously associated with the Babylonian exile of the Jews, the result of an imperial technique of pacification, used also by the Assyrians, in which ethnic groups in conquered areas were deported en masse to the capital. According to the Hebrew Bible, he destroyed Solomon's Temple and exiled the Jews to Babylon. The defeat was also recorded in the Babylonian Chronicles.

Persian conquest

In 539 BC, the Neo-Babylonian Empire fell to Cyrus the Great, king of Persia, with a military engagement known as the Battle of Opis. Babylon's walls were considered impenetrable. The only way into the city was through one of its many gates or through the Euphrates River. Metal grates were installed underwater, allowing the river to flow through the city walls while preventing intrusion. The Persians devised a plan to enter the city via the river. During a Babylonian national feast, Cyrus' troops upstream diverted the Euphrates River, allowing Cyrus' soldiers to enter the city through the lowered water. The Persian army conquered the outlying areas of the city while the majority of Babylonians at the city center were unaware of the breach. The account was elaborated upon by Herodotus and is also mentioned in parts of the Hebrew Bible. Herodotus also described a moat, an enormously tall and broad wall cemented with bitumen and with buildings on top, and a hundred gates to the city. He also writes that the Babylonians wear turbans and perfume and bury their dead in honey, that they practice ritual prostitution, and that three tribes among them eat nothing but fish. The hundred gates can be considered a reference to Homer, and following the pronouncement of Archibald Henry Sayce in 1883, Herodotus' account of Babylon has largely been considered to represent Greek folklore rather than an authentic voyage to Babylon. However, recently, Dalley and others have suggested taking Herodotus' account seriously.

According to 2 Chronicles 36 of the Hebrew Bible, Cyrus later issued a decree permitting captive people, including the Jews, to return to their own lands. The text found on the Cyrus Cylinder has traditionally been seen by biblical scholars as corroborative evidence of this policy, although the interpretation is disputed because the text identifies only Mesopotamian sanctuaries but makes no mention of Jews, Jerusalem, or Judea.

Under Cyrus and the subsequent Persian king Darius I, Babylon became the capital city of the 9th Satrapy (Babylonia in the south and Athura in the north), as well as a center of learning and scientific advancement. In Achaemenid Persia, the ancient Babylonian arts of astronomy and mathematics were revitalized, and Babylonian scholars completed maps of constellations. The city became the administrative capital of the Persian Empire and remained prominent for over two centuries. Many important archaeological discoveries have been made that can provide a better understanding of that era.

The early Persian kings had attempted to maintain the religious ceremonies of Marduk, who was the most important god, but by the reign of Darius III, over-taxation and the strain of numerous wars led to a deterioration of Babylon's main shrines and canals, and the destabilization of the surrounding region. There were numerous attempts at rebellion and in 522 BC (Nebuchadnezzar III), 521 BC (Nebuchadnezzar IV) and 482 BC (Bel-shimani and Shamash-eriba) native Babylonian kings briefly regained independence. However, these revolts were quickly repressed and Babylon remained under Persian rule for two centuries, until Alexander the Great's entry in 331 BC.

Hellenistic period
In October of 331 BC, Darius III, the last Achaemenid king of the Persian Empire, was defeated by the forces of the Ancient Macedonian ruler Alexander at the Battle of Gaugamela.

Under Alexander, Babylon again flourished as a center of learning and commerce. However, following Alexander's death in 323 BC in the palace of Nebuchadnezzar, his empire was divided amongst his generals, the Diadochi, and decades of fighting soon began. The constant turmoil virtually emptied the city of Babylon. A tablet dated 275 BC states that the inhabitants of Babylon were transported to Seleucia, where a palace and a temple (Esagila) were built. With this deportation, Babylon became insignificant as a city, although more than a century later, sacrifices were still performed in its old sanctuary.

Renewed Persian rule

Under the Parthian and Sassanid Empires, Babylon (like Assyria) became a province of these Persian Empires for nine centuries, until after AD 650. Although it was captured briefly by Trajan in AD 116 to be part of the newly conquered province of Mesopotamia, his successor Hadrian relinquished his conquests east of the Euphrates river, which became again the Roman Empire's eastern boundary.

However, Babylon maintained its own culture and people, who spoke varieties of Aramaic, and who continued to refer to their homeland as Babylon. Examples of their culture are found in the Babylonian Talmud, the Gnostic Mandaean religion, Eastern Rite Christianity and the religion of the philosopher Mani. Christianity was introduced to Mesopotamia in the 1st and 2nd centuries AD, and Babylon was the seat of a Bishop of the Church of the East until well after the Arab/Islamic conquest. Coins from the Parthian, Sasanian and Arabic periods excavated in Babylon demonstrate the continuity of settlement there.

Muslim conquest

In the mid-7th century, Mesopotamia was invaded and settled by the expanding Muslim Empire, and a period of Islamization followed. Babylon was dissolved as a province and Aramaic and Church of the East Christianity eventually became marginalized. Ibn Hawqal (10th century) and the Arab scholar, al-Qazwini (13th century), describe Babylon (Babil) as a small village. The latter described a well referred to as the 'Dungeon of Daniel' that was visited by Christians and Jews during holidays. The grave-shrine of Amran ibn Ali was visited by Muslims.

Babylon is mentioned in medieval Arabic writings as a source of bricks, said to have been used in cities from Baghdad to Basra.

European travellers, in many cases, could not discover the city's location, or mistook Fallujah for it. Benjamin of Tudela, a 12th-century traveller, mentions Babylon, but it is not clear if he went there. Others referred to Baghdad as Babylon or New Babylon and described various structures encountered in the region as the Tower of Babel. Pietro della Valle travelled to the village of Babil in Babylon in the 17th century and noted the existence of both baked and dried mudbricks cemented with bitumen.

Modern era

The eighteenth century saw an increasing flow of travellers to Babylon, including Carsten Niebuhr and Pierre-Joseph de Beauchamp, as well as measurements of its latitude. Beauchamp's memoir, published in English translation in 1792, provoked the British East India Company to direct its agents in Baghdad and Basra to acquire Mesopotamian relics for shipment to London.

By 1905, there were several villages in Babylon, one of which was Qwaresh with about 200 households located within the boundaries of the ancient inner city walls. The village grew due to the need for laborers during the German Oriental Society excavations (1899-1917).

Excavation and research

Claudius Rich, working for the British East India Company in Baghdad, excavated Babylon in 1811–12 and again in 1817. Captain Robert Mignan explored the site briefly in 1827 and in 1829 he completed a map of Babylon which includes the location of several villages. William Loftus visited there in 1849. Austen Henry Layard made some soundings during a brief visit in 1850 before abandoning the site.

Fulgence Fresnel, Julius Oppert and Felix Thomas heavily excavated Babylon from 1852 to 1854. However, much of their work was lost in the Qurnah Disaster when a transport ship and four rafts sank on the Tigris river in May 1855. They had been carrying over 200 crates of artifacts from various excavation missions when they were attacked by Tigris river pirates near Al-Qurnah. Recovery efforts, assisted by the Ottoman authorities and British Residence in Baghdad, loaded the equivalent of 80 crates on a ship for Le Havre in May 1856. Few antiquities from the Fresnel mission would make it to France. Subsequent efforts to recover the lost antiquities from the Tigris, including a Japanese expedition in 1971–72, have been largely unsuccessful.

Henry Rawlinson and George Smith worked there briefly in 1854. The next excavation was conducted by Hormuzd Rassam on behalf of the British Museum. Work began in 1879, continuing until 1882, and was prompted by widespread looting of the site. Using industrial scale digging in search of artifacts, Rassam recovered a large quantity of cuneiform tablets and other finds. The zealous excavation methods, common at the time, caused significant damage to the archaeological context. Many tablets had appeared on the market in 1876 before Rassam's excavation began.

A team from the German Oriental Society led by Robert Koldewey conducted the first scientific archaeological excavations at Babylon. The work was conducted daily from 1899 until 1917. A major problem for Koldewey was the large scale mining of baked bricks which had begun in the 19th century and which were mainly sourced from the time of Nebuchadnezzar II. At the time excavations began brick mining for various building efforts including the Hindiya dam were under way. The primary efforts of the dig involved the temple of Marduk and the processional way leading up to it, as well as the city wall. Artifacts, including pieces of the Ishtar Gate and hundreds of recovered tablets, were sent back to Germany, where Koldewey's colleague Walter Andrae reconstructed them into displays at the Vorderasiatisches Museum Berlin. The German archaeologists fled before oncoming British troops in 1917, and again, many objects went missing in the following years.

Further work by the German Archaeological Institute was conducted by Heinrich J. Lenzen in 1956 and Hansjörg Schmid in 1962. Lenzen's work dealt primarily with the Hellenistic theatre, and Schmid focused on the temple ziggurat Etemenanki.

The site was excavated in 1974 on behalf of the Turin Centre for Archaeological Research and Excavations in the Middle East and Asia and the Iraqi-Italian Institute of Archaeological Sciences. The focus was on clearing up issues raised by re-examination of the old German data. Additional work in 1987–1989 concentrated on the area surrounding the Ishara and Ninurta temples in the Shu-Anna city-quarter of Babylon.

During the restoration efforts in Babylon, the Iraqi State Organization for Antiquities and Heritage conducted extensive research, excavation and clearing, but wider publication of these archaeological activities has been limited. Indeed, most of the known tablets from all modern excavations remain unpublished.

Iraqi government
The site of Babylon has been a cultural asset to Iraq since the creation of the modern Iraqi state in 1921. The site was officially protected and excavated by the Kingdom of Iraq under British Administration, which later became the Hashemite Kingdom of Iraq, and its successors: the Arab Federation, the Iraqi Republic, Ba'athist Iraq (also officially called the Iraqi Republic), and the Republic of Iraq. Babylonian images periodically appear on Iraqi postcards and stamps. In the 1960s, a replica of the Ishtar Gate and a reconstruction of Ninmakh Temple were built on site.

On 14 February 1978, the Ba'athist government of Iraq under Saddam Hussein began the "Archaeological Restoration of Babylon Project": reconstructing features of the ancient city atop its ruins. These features included the Southern Palace of Nebuchadnezzar, with 250 rooms, five courtyards, and a 30-meter entrance arch. The project also reinforced the Processional Way, the Lion of Babylon, and an amphitheater constructed in the city's Hellenistic era. In 1982, the government minted a set of seven coins displaying iconic features of Babylon. A Babylon International Festival was held in September 1987, and annually thereafter until 2002 (excepting 1990 and 1991), to showcase this work. The proposed reconstruction of the Hanging Gardens and the great ziggurat never took place.

Hussein installed a portrait of himself and Nebuchadnezzar at the entrance to the ruins and inscribed his name on many of the bricks, in imitation of Nebuchadnezzar. One frequent inscription reads: "This was built by Saddam Hussein, son of Nebuchadnezzar, to glorify Iraq". These bricks became sought after as collectors' items after Hussein's downfall. Similar projects were conducted at Nineveh, Nimrud, Assur and Hatra, to demonstrate the magnificence of Arab achievement.

In the 1980s, Saddam Hussein completely removed the village of Qwaresh, displacing its residents. He later constructed a modern palace in that area called Saddam Hill over some of the old ruins, in the pyramidal style of a ziggurat. In 2003, he intended to have a cable car line constructed over Babylon, but plans were halted by the 2003 invasion of Iraq.

Under US and Polish occupation

Following the 2003 invasion of Iraq, the area around Babylon came under the control of US troops, before being handed over to Polish forces in September 2003. US forces under the command of General James T. Conway of the I Marine Expeditionary Force were criticized for building the military base "Camp Alpha", with a helipad and other facilities on ancient Babylonian ruins during the Iraq War. US forces have occupied the site for some time and have caused irreparable damage to the archaeological record. In a report of the British Museum's Near East department, Dr. John Curtis described how parts of the archaeological site were levelled to create a landing area for helicopters, and parking lots for heavy vehicles. Curtis wrote of the occupation forces:

A US military spokesman claimed that engineering operations were discussed with the "head of the Babylon museum". The head of the Iraqi State Board for Heritage and Antiquities, Donny George, said that the "mess will take decades to sort out" and criticised Polish troops for causing "terrible damage" to the site. Poland resolved in 2004 to place the city under Iraq control, and commissioned a report titled Report Concerning the Condition of the Preservation of the Babylon Archaeological Site, which it presented at a meeting on 11–13 December 2004. In 2005, the site was handed over to the Iraqi Ministry of Culture.

In April 2006, Colonel John Coleman, former Chief of Staff for the I Marine Expeditionary Force, offered to issue an apology for the damage done by military personnel under his command. However, he also claimed that the US presence had deterred far greater damage by other looters. An article published in April 2006 stated that UN officials and Iraqi leaders have plans to restore Babylon, making it into a cultural center.

Two museums and a library, containing replicas of artifacts and local maps and reports, were raided and destroyed.

Present-day 
In May 2009, the provincial government of Babil reopened the site to tourists and over 35,000 people visited in 2017. An oil pipeline runs through an outer wall of the city. On 5 July 2019, the site of Babylon was inscribed as a UNESCO World Heritage Site. 

Thousands of people reside in Babylon within the perimeter of the ancient outer city walls, and communities in and around them are "rapidly developing from compact, dense settlements to sprawling suburbia despite laws restricting constructions". Modern villages include Zwair West, Sinjar Village, Qwaresh, and Al-Jimjmah among which the first two are better off economically. Most residents primarily depend on daily wage earning or have government jobs in Al-Hillah, while few cultivate dates, citrus fruits, figs, fodder for livestock and limited cash crops, although income from the land alone is not enough to sustain a family. Both Shi'a and Sunni Muslims live in Sinjar village with mosques for both groups.

The State Board of Antiquities and Heritage (SBAH) is the main authority responsible for the conservation of the archeological site. They are assisted by Antiquity and Heritage Police and maintain a permanent presence there. The World Monuments Fund is also involved in research and conservation. The SBAH Provincial Inspectorate Headquarters is located within the boundaries of the ancient inner city walls on the east side and several staff members and their families reside in subsidized housing in this area.

Cultural importance

Before modern archaeological excavations in Mesopotamia, the appearance of Babylon was largely a mystery, and typically envisioned by Western artists as a hybrid between ancient Egyptian, classical Greek, and contemporary Ottoman culture.

Due to Babylon's historical significance as well as references to it in the Bible, the word "Babylon" in various languages has acquired a generic meaning of a large, bustling diverse city. Examples include:
Babylon is used in reggae music as a concept in the Rastafari belief system, denoting the materialistic capitalist world, or any form of imperialist evil. It is believed that Babylon actively seeks to exploit and oppress the people of the world, specifically people of African descent. It is believed by Rastafarians that Babylon attempts to forbid the smoking of ganja because this sacred herb opens minds to the truth.
Freemasonry, which has its own versions of biblical legends, classically considered Babylon as its birthplace and a haven for science and knowledge.
Babylon 5 – A science fiction series set on a futuristic space station that acts as a trading and diplomatic nexus between many different cultures. Many stories focus on the theme of different societies and cultures uniting, respecting differences, and learning from each other rather than fighting or looking on each other with prejudice and suspicion.
Babylon A.D. takes place in New York City, decades in the future.
Babilonas (Lithuanian name for "Babylon") is a real estate development in Lithuania.
"Babylon" is a song by Lady Gaga that uses allusions to ancient Biblical themes to discuss gossip.
Eternals (2021), depicts Babylon on its greatest extent and is shown to be protected and aided in its development by the eternals.

Biblical narrative
In the Book of Genesis, Babel (Babylon) is described as founded by Nimrod along with Uruk, Akkad and perhaps Calneh—all of them in Shinar ("Calneh" is now sometimes translated not as a proper name but as the phrase "all of them"). Another story is given in Genesis 11, which describes a united human race, speaking one language, migrating to Shinar to establish a city and tower—the Tower of Babel. God halts construction of the tower by scattering humanity across the earth and confusing their communication so they are unable to understand each other in the same language.

After Hezekiah, the king of Judah, became ill, Baladan, king of Babylon, sent a letter and gifts to him. Hezekiah showed all of his treasures to the delegation, and the prophet Isaiah later said to him: "Behold, the days are coming when everything that is in your house, and what your fathers have stored up to this day, will be carried to Babylon; nothing will be left." Some 200 years later, Nebuchadnezzar, the king of Babylon, invaded Judah, laid siege to Jerusalem and deported the Jews to Babylon.

The prophet Daniel lived in Babylon for most of his life. Nebuchadnezzar made Daniel ruler over the entire province of Babylon for having interpreted his dream. Years later, Belshazzar held a banquet, at which fingers of a hand appeared and wrote on a wall. Daniel was called to provide an interpretation of the writings, upon which he explained that God had put an end to Belshazzar's kingdom. Belshazzar was killed that very night, and Darius the Mede took over the kingdom.

The Book of Isaiah says the following regarding Babylon: "It will be like Sodom and Gomorrah when God overthrew them. It will never be inhabited or lived in for all generations; no Arab will pitch his tent there; no shepherds will make their flocks lie down there." The Book of Jeremiah says that Babylon will "never again be inhabited" and that "no one will live there, nor will anyone of mankind reside in it" and that it will be a land in which "no one of mankind passes". The territories of Babylon, Edom, Bozrah, Moab, Tyre, Hazor, and the sons of Ammon are all predicted in the Bible to become like Sodom and Gomorrah, or uninhabited forever.

Several Biblical prophecy scholars, most notably Chuck Missler, maintain that the "Doom of Babylon" as described in detail in Isaiah 13–14, Jeremiah 50–51, and possibly Revelation 17–18 must refer to a literal, future destruction of an actual city. Missler has written that Babylon has yet to be completely destroyed as prophesied by Isaiah and Jeremiah. The Persians were able to take Babylon without a fight in 539 BC.

In Jewish tradition, Babylon symbolizes an oppressor against which righteous believers must struggle. In Christianity, Babylon symbolizes worldliness and evil. Prophecies sometimes symbolically link the kings of Babylon with Lucifer. Nebuchadnezzar II, sometimes conflated with Nabonidus, appears as the foremost ruler in this narrative.

The Book of Revelation in the Christian Bible refers to Babylon many centuries after it ceased to be a major political center. The city is personified by the "Whore of Babylon", riding on a scarlet beast with seven heads and ten horns, and drunk on the blood of the righteous. Some scholars of apocalyptic literature believe this New Testament "Babylon" to be a dysphemism for the Roman Empire. Other scholars suggest that Babylon in the book of Revelation has a symbolic significance that extends beyond mere identification with the first century Roman empire.

Babylon in art

See also
Akitu
Cities of the ancient Near East
Jehoiachin's Rations Tablets
List of Kings of Babylon
Tomb of Daniel

Notes

References

Sources 

Cancik-Kirschbaum, Eva, Margarete van Ess, & Joachim Marzahn, eds. (2011). Babylon: Wissenskultur in Orient und Okzident. Berlin/Boston: De Gruyter. .
Finkel, I. L. and M. J. Seymour, eds. Babylon. Oxford University Press, 2009.  . Exhibition organized by British Museum, Musée du Louvre & Réunion des Musées Nationaux, and Staatliche Museen zu Berlin.
Liverani, Mario. Imagining Babylon: The Modern Story of an Ancient City. Translated from Italian to English by Ailsa Campbell. Boston: De Gruyter, 2016. . Originally published as Immaginare Babele in 2013.

Vedeler, Harold Torger. A Social and Economic Survey of the Reign of Samsuiluna of Babylon (1794–1712 BC). PhD dissertation accepted at Yale, May 2006.

Further reading 

 – originally published in German 
Rich, Claudius:
1815. Memoir on the Ruins of Babylon. Third Edition, 1818.
1818. Second Memoir on Babylon.
1839. Narrative of a journey to the site of Babylon in 1811. Posthumous compilation.

External links

Iranian archaeologists to perform survey in Babylon - Tehran Times - January 29, 2023
Modern Wars and Ancient Governance: Archaeology and Textual Finds from First Millennium BCE Babylon – Odette Boivin – ANE Today – Nov 2022
– The Babylonian Akītu Festival and the Ritual Humiliation of the King – Sam Mirelman – ANE Today – Sep 2022
The Babylon Project – Freie Universität Berlin

Iraq Image – Babylon Satellite Observation
Site Photographs of Babylon – Oriental Institute
1901–1906 Jewish Encyclopedia, Babylon
Beyond Babylon: art, trade, and diplomacy in the second millennium B.C., Issued in connection with an exhibition held Nov. 18, 2008-Mar. 15, 2009, Metropolitan Museum of Art, New York
Osama S. M. Amin, "Visiting the ancient city of Babylon", Ancient History Et Cetera, 17 November 2014.
Video of reconstructed palace: 
Babylon wrecked by war, The Guardian, January 15, 2005

UNESCO Final Report on Damage Assessment in Babylon

 
Amorite cities
Archaeological sites in Iraq
Articles containing video clips
Babil Governorate
Former populated places in Iraq
Hebrew Bible cities
Historic Jewish communities
Levant
Nimrod
Populated places established in the 3rd millennium BC
Populated places disestablished in the 10th century
1811 archaeological discoveries
Populated places on the Euphrates River
World Heritage Sites in Iraq